The history of armed conflicts involving the United States of America spans a period of more than four centuries. A period ranging from the early era of European colonization and the formation of the new national polity that would become the United States, to its evolvement through technological and political upheavals into a decisively modern republic and military force, and ascent onto the world stage, through the calamities of the 20th century, as the largely unrivaled hegemon that it is today.

Colonial and early national period 

The lines of conflict demarcating the wars, rebellions, and revolutions in the North American colonial and national period can be traced far back into early pre-Columbian times. However, due to the scarcity of written sources, not least resulting from the Spanish colonizers destroying a sizable amount of original Maya writings, deeming them to be heretical, historians typically make the early European settlements as their initial point of departure, of which sources are more plentiful.

A further concern highlighted by historians, relating to the history of slavery and colonialism in particular, is the inherent unevenness of the terrain in which conflicts erupt, and often tremendous disproportionality of means by which they are fought and settled. As historian Ira Berlin points out slavery, by its very definition, poses a profound asymmetry of power: "For three centuries, slave masters mobilized enormous resources that stretched across continents and oceans and employed them with great ferocity in an effort to subdue their human property. Slaves, for their part, had little to depend upon but themselves."

As such, four distinctive lines of conflict can be identified weaving through the colonial and early national period. Firstly, the conflicts between the European colonists and the Native American tribes. Secondly, the rival conflicts between the European states over control of the Americas. Thirdly, the mounting tensions and armed conflicts between the settlers and their rulers in Europe. And lastly, as violence between the white people grew, so too did the revolutionary fervor of the African slaves in their quest for freedom through armed insurrection.

19th-century

20th-century

21st-century

See also
 List of wars involving the United States
 U.S. support for Saudi-led operations in Yemen
 Military history of the United States
 American imperialism
 Indian removal
 Foreign policy of the United States
 Timeline of United States military operations
 List of incidents of civil unrest in the United States
 List of massacres in the United States
 United States involvement in regime change
 United States war crimes
 Genocide of indigenous peoples
 United States military casualties of war
 List of ongoing armed conflicts

References

External links
 Heidelberg Institute for International Conflict Research (HIIK)
 Conflict Barometer – Describes recent trends in conflict development, escalations, and settlements
 A Continent Divided: The U.S.-Mexico War, Center for Greater Southwestern Studies, the University of Texas at Arlington
 Timeline of wars involving the United States, Histropedia
 U.S. Periods of War and Dates of Recent Conflicts, Congressional Research Service

 
United States
Wars
Wars